Miloud(ميلود in Arabic) is a masculine Given name which refers to the birth of the Prophet of Islam Muhamed El Mawlid Ennabawi  (and deriving from the latter). In the Middle-East, the name is Miled, with the same root.

This name is  mainly used in Maghreb (the North African subregion), and in Europe by families from North Africa living in Europe, notably in France.

It is a custom to give a son the name  Miloud or Miled if he happens to be born on the day of the Prophet's Birth.

Variants 

A female variant of this name, Milouda, has appeared, mostly in Maghreb and Europe:  it is merely the feminine derivation of Miloud and has the same meaning.

References

Masculine given names
African masculine given names